The Europe/Africa Zone was one of the three zones of the regional Davis Cup competition in 1997.

In the Europe/Africa Zone there were four different tiers, called groups, in which teams competed against each other to advance to the upper tier. The top two teams in Europe/Africa IV advanced to the Europe/Africa Zone Group III in 1998. All other teams remained in Group IV.

Participating nations

Draw
 Venue: Tennis Centre, Gaborone, Botswana
 Date: 19–23 March

Group A

Group B

1st to 4th place play-offs

5th to 8th place play-offs

Final standings

  and  promoted to Group III in 1998.

Round robin

Group A

Liechtenstein vs. Sudan

Togo vs. Uganda

Liechtenstein vs. Uganda

Sudan vs. Togo

Liechtenstein vs. Togo

Sudan vs. Uganda

Group B

Botswana vs. Djibouti

Iceland vs. Madagascar

Botswana vs. Madagascar

Djibouti vs. Iceland

Botswana vs. Iceland

Djibouti vs. Madagascar

1st to 4th place play-offs

Semifinals

Botswana vs. Togo

Liechtenstein vs. Madagascar

Final

Togo vs. Madagascar

3rd to 4th play-off

Liechtenstein vs. Botswana

5th to 8th place play-offs

5th to 8th play-offs

Uganda vs. Djibouti

Sudan vs. Iceland

5th to 6th play-off

Uganda vs. Sudan

7th to 8th play-off

Djibouti vs. Iceland

References

External links
Davis Cup official website

Davis Cup Europe/Africa Zone
Europe Africa Zone Group IV